= Catherine Upton =

British poet in Gibraltar

Catherine Upton (fl. 1780s) was a poet and governess who was in Gibraltar during the time of the Great Siege (1779–1783). Her husband was Lieutenant John Upton of the 72nd Manchester Regiment. In 1787, she published The siege of Gibraltar, from the twelfth of April to the twenty-seventh of May, 1781, an account of life in Gibraltar during the first part of the Siege.
